The Victims and Witnesses (Scotland) Act 2014 is an Act of the Scottish Parliament which passed through the legislative body in 2013 and received Royal Assent on 17 January 2014. It brought into law a number of changes to modify the experience victims and witnesses have within Scotland's justice system.

This Act made provisions for:

 creating a duty for justice organisations to set clear standards of service for victims and witnesses
 giving victims and witnesses new rights to certain information about their case
 improving support for vulnerable witnesses in court – for example, changing the definition of 'child witness' to include all those under 18 (instead of under 16), and creating a presumption that certain categories of victim are vulnerable, and giving such victims the right to utilise certain special measures when giving evidence
 introducing a victim surcharge so that offenders contribute to the cost of supporting victims
 introducing restitution orders, allowing the court to require that offenders who assault police officers pay to support the specialist non-NHS services which assist in the recovery of such individuals
 allowing victims to make oral representations about the release of life sentence prisoners.

History
The Bill creating the Act was introduced to Parliament on 13 February 2013 by Kenny MacAskill MSP and received Royal Assent on 17 January 2014, creating the Victims and Witnesses (Scotland) Act 2014. Parts of the Act came into force the following day, 18 January 2014, with the remainder being introduced gradually between August 2014 and September 2015, although the Act does not yet apply to cases in Justice of the Peace courts.

References

Acts of the Scottish Parliament 2014
Scottish criminal law